Georg Steinhauser (born 21 October 2001) is a German racing cyclist, who currently rides for UCI WorldTeam .

For the 2022 season, Steinhauser joined UCI WorldTeam  on a two-year contract while simultaneously taking on a metalworking apprenticeship.

His father Tobias was also a professional cyclist.

Major results
2019
 1st Overall Ain Bugey Valromey Tour
1st Stage 4
 Saarland Trofeo
1st Mountains classification
1st Stage 3b (TTT)
 4th Overall Oberösterreich Juniorenrundfahrt
 10th Overall Tour du Pays de Vaud
2021
 1st Stage 3 Giro della Valle d'Aosta
 2nd Overall Tour of Bulgaria
1st Young rider classification
 3rd Il Piccolo Lombardia
 9th Overall Tour de l'Ain
2022
 1st Stage 5 (TTT) Tour de l'Avenir
 5th Time trial, National Road Championships

References

External links

2001 births
Living people
German male cyclists
Place of birth missing (living people)